Lexi Atkins (born February 10, 1993) is an American actress, model and beauty pageant titleholder who was crowned Miss Illinois USA and Miss Illinois Teen USA. Atkins is known for her roles in The Boy Next Door starring Jennifer Lopez, Zombeavers, and Ted 2

Career 
Atkins was born and raised in Champaign, Illinois. Having won several beauty pageants in her home-state, Atkins received her first acting opportunity in 2014 with the film Zombeavers. Alongside her acting and modeling work, she also founded Tely Organics in 2021 in affiliation with Erewhon Market in Los Angeles, California.

Filmography

References

External links 
 

Female models from Illinois
American actresses
1993 births
Living people
People from Champaign, Illinois